Anna and the King is a television sitcom that aired Sunday nights at 7:30 pm (EST) on CBS as part of its 1972 fall lineup.

Overview
Anna and the King is a non-musical adaptation of the film of Rodgers and Hammerstein's The King and I (1956), which was in turn based on the 1944 novel Anna and the King of Siam by Margaret Landon. Unlike the majority of attempts to turn hit films into television series, Anna and the King featured the original film's star, Yul Brynner, who was more identified with that role than any other.

The plot, like that of the musical, involved the king's bringing to Siam of a British governess, Anna Leonowens (portrayed here by Samantha Eggar), to educate his 12-year-old son and heir, Crown Prince Chulalongkorn (Brian Tochi). As time goes on, the two develop a platonic infatuation with each other, despite the low status of women in Siamese society, which appalls Anna, as does the king's related practice of polygamy. Also appearing regularly was a member of the royal household, Kralahome (Keye Luke).

While the musical, both film and stage versions, was a worldwide success (Brynner was still touring in the stage version until just before his death), this series was cancelled at midseason.

Cast

Episodes

Unsuccessful lawsuit by Margaret Landon

Margaret Landon was unhappy with this series and charged the producers with "inaccurate and mutilated portrayals" of her literary property; she unsuccessfully sued for copyright infringement.

References
Brooks, Tim and Marsh, Earle, The Complete Directory to Prime Time Network and Cable TV Shows

Notes

External links

 

1972 American television series debuts
1972 American television series endings
1970s American sitcoms
CBS original programming
Live action television shows based on films
Television shows based on American novels
Television series by 20th Century Fox Television
Television series set in the 1860s
Television shows set in Thailand
Cultural depictions of Anna Leonowens
Cultural depictions of Mongkut
Television series based on adaptations
Television shows set in New York City
The King and I